Adalto Batista da Silva (born 30 August 1978) is a former Brazilian footballer who played in the left back position.

Honours
 Taça da Liga: 2007–08
 Uruguayan Primera División: 2000, 2001

External links
 
 

1978 births
Living people
People from Votuporanga
Association football defenders
Brazilian footballers
Brazilian expatriate footballers
América Futebol Clube (RN) players
Uruguayan Primera División players
Club Nacional de Football players
Expatriate footballers in Uruguay
J1 League players
Hokkaido Consadole Sapporo players
Expatriate footballers in Japan
Campeonato Brasileiro Série A players
Sociedade Esportiva Palmeiras players
Süper Lig players
Samsunspor footballers
Expatriate footballers in Turkey
Brazilian expatriate sportspeople in Turkey
Guarani FC players
Primeira Liga players
Vitória F.C. players
Expatriate footballers in Portugal
América Futebol Clube (SP) players
Marília Atlético Clube players
Footballers from São Paulo (state)